Ivo Rusev (Bulgarian: Иво Русев; born 14 June 1962) is a Bulgarian former rower who competed in the 1980 Summer Olympics.

References

1962 births
Living people
Bulgarian male rowers
Olympic rowers of Bulgaria
Rowers at the 1980 Summer Olympics
Olympic bronze medalists for Bulgaria
Olympic medalists in rowing
Place of birth missing (living people)
Medalists at the 1980 Summer Olympics